John Chester Brooks Morris (February 16, 1901 – September 11, 1970) was an American stage, film, television, and radio actor. He had some prestigious film roles early in his career, and received an Academy Award nomination for Alibi (1929). Chester Morris is remembered for portraying Boston Blackie, a criminal-turned-detective, in the Boston Blackie film series of the 1940s.

Early years

Chester Morris was born John Chester Brooks Morris in New York City, and was one of five children of Broadway stage actor William Morris and stage comedienne Etta Hawkins. His siblings who lived to adulthood were screenwriter-actor Gordon Morris, actor Adrian Morris, and actress Wilhelmina Morris. Another brother, Lloyd Morris, had died young.

Morris dropped out of school and began his Broadway career at 15 years old opposite Lionel Barrymore in The Copperhead. He made his film debut in the silent comedy-drama film An Amateur Orphan (1917).

After appearing in several more Broadway productions in the early 1920s, Morris joined his parents, sister, and two brothers, Gordon and Adrian, on the vaudeville circuit. From 1923, they performed William Morris' original sketch called All the Horrors of Home, which premiered at the Palace Theatre, New York, then on the Keith-Orpheum circuit for two years, including Proctor's Theatre, Mount Vernon, New York, and culminating in Los Angeles in 1925. Morris returned to Broadway with roles in The Home Towners (1926) and Yellow (1927). While appearing in the 1927 play Crime, he was spotted by a talent agent and was signed to a film contract.

Career

Morris made his sound film debut in the 1929 film Alibi, for which he was nominated for an Academy Award for Best Actor. He followed with roles in Woman Trap (1929), The Case of Sergeant Grischa (1930) and The Divorcee, starring Norma Shearer in 1930. Later that year, Morris was cast as one of the leads (with Wallace Beery and Robert Montgomery) in the MGM prison drama The Big House. For the next two years, he worked steadily in films for United Artists and MGM and was cast opposite Jean Harlow in the 1932 comedy-drama Red-Headed Woman.

By the mid- to late 1930s, Morris' popularity had begun to wane and he was cast as the lead actor in such B-movies as Smashing the Rackets (1938) and Five Came Back (1939). In 1941, Morris' career was revived when he was cast as criminal-turned-detective Boston Blackie. Morris appeared in a total of 14 Boston Blackie films for Columbia Pictures, beginning with Meet Boston Blackie. He reprised the role of Boston Blackie for the radio series in 1944. During World War II, Morris performed magic tricks in over 350 USO shows. He had been practicing magic since the age of 12 and was considered a top amateur magician.

While appearing in the Boston Blackie series, Morris continued to appear in roles in other films mostly for Pine-Thomas films for Paramount Pictures. After appearing in 1949's Boston Blackie's Chinese Venture, the final Boston Blackie film, Morris largely retired from films. During the 1950s, he focused mainly on television and theatre, returning to Broadway in 1954 in the comedy The Fifth Season. During this time, Morris also appeared in guest spots for the anthology series Cameo Theatre, Lights Out, Tales of Tomorrow, Alcoa Premiere, Suspense, Danger, Robert Montgomery Presents, The Web, Phillip Morris Playhouse, Studio One, and Kraft Television Theatre. He briefly returned to films in 1955 with a role in the prison drama Unchained, followed by a role in the 1956 science-fiction horror film The She-Creature. In 1960, he had recurring role as Detective Lieutenant Max Ritter in the CBS summer replacement series, Diagnosis: Unknown. The series lasted a year, after which Morris appeared in the NBC television film A String of Beads. In November 1960, he returned to Broadway as Senator Bob Munson in the stage adaptation of the 1959 novel Advise and Consent. Morris remained with the production until it closed in May 1961. In October, he reprised his role for the touring production.

In the early to mid-1960s, Morris appeared in guest spots for the dramas Route 66, The Defenders, and Dr. Kildare. In 1965, he replaced Jack Albertson in the Broadway production of The Subject Was Roses. He reprised his role in the play for the touring production in 1966.

Illness and death
In mid-1968, Morris starred opposite Barbara Britton in the touring production of Where Did We Go Wrong?. After the production wrapped, he returned to his home in Manhattan, where his health began to decline. Morris was later diagnosed with stomach cancer.

Despite his declining health, Morris began work on what was his last film role, as Pop Weaver in the biographical drama The Great White Hope (1970). The film was released after his death. After filming wrapped, Morris joined the stage production of The Caine Mutiny Court Martial at the Bucks County Playhouse in New Hope, Pennsylvania.

On September 11, 1970, Lee R. Yopp, the producer and director of Caine, was scheduled to have lunch with Morris. After Yopp could not reach Morris by phone at his motel room, he went to Morris' room, where he found the actor's body lying on the floor. The county coroner attributed Morris' death to an overdose of barbiturates. His remains were cremated and scattered over a German river.

Personal life

Morris was married twice. He first married Suzanne Kilbourne on November 8, 1926. They had two children, John Brooks and Cynthia. Kilbourne was granted an interlocutory divorce in November 1939 which was finalized on November 26, 1940.

On November 30, 1940, Morris married socialite Lillian Kenton Barker at the home of actor Frank Morgan. They had a son, Kenton, born in 1944. The couple remained married until Morris' death in 1970.

Select theatre credits

Filmography

Select television credits

Select radio credits

References

Sources

External links

 
 
 

1901 births
1970 deaths
20th-century American male actors
American male child actors
American male film actors
American male radio actors
American male silent film actors
American male stage actors
American male television actors
Drug-related deaths in Pennsylvania
Barbiturates-related deaths
Male actors from New York City
Metro-Goldwyn-Mayer contract players
Vaudeville performers